The Demigod Diaries is a collection of short stories relating to The Heroes of Olympus book series.

Summary
The Demigod Diaries contains four new stories, illustrations of Annabeth Chase, Percy Jackson, Jason Grace, Piper McLean, Leo Valdez, Luke Castellan and first ever seen pictures of Thalia Grace and Hal, a character that is introduced in the first story, puzzles, and a quiz. The four stories include:
 Thalia's, Luke's, and Annabeth's adventures before the Percy Jackson and the Olympians series began;
 A first-person narrative from Percy's viewpoint as he and Annabeth complete a task given by Hermes regarding his staff which happens a month after the end of The Last Olympian and before Percy went missing in The Lost Hero;
 A story involving Jason, Leo, and Piper during their time spent at Camp Half-Blood between The Lost Hero and The Mark of Athena.

It also includes a short story by Riordan's son, Haley Riordan, revolving around one of the demigods who fought for Kronos during the Second Titan War and survived the battle in Manhattan.

Stories

The Diary of Luke Castellan 
Set five years before the start of The Lightning Thief and narrated by Luke Castellan, this story follows the adventures of Luke and his companion, Thalia Grace, as they meet with Halcyon Green, a prophetic, desolate demigod son of Apollo, who briefly foretells their futures.

Percy Jackson and the Staff of Hermes 
Set on September 18, a month after the end of The Last Olympian, before Percy Jackson and Jason Grace's switch by Hera and narrated by Percy, the story follows Percy and Annabeth Chase's unfortunate date as they are tasked by Hermes to retrieve his stolen caduceus.

Leo Valdez and the Quest for Buford 
Set between the events of The Lost Hero and The Son of Neptune and narrated by Leo Valdez, the story follows Leo, aided by his friends Jason Grace and Piper McLean, as he faces off in a vicious conflict with the maenads, the maniac followers of Dionysus, the god of Wine.

The Son of Magic 
This story was written by Rick Riordan's son Haley and marked his debut as a professional writer. It is set sometime after the events of The Last Olympian and told in the limited, subjective third-person. The plot follows the mortal Dr. Howard Claymore as he becomes involved in a conflict between two children of Hecate: the demigod Alabaster Torrington, and the vengeful, demigod-hating daemon, Lamia.

Release
The Demigod Diaries was released on 14 August 2012.

See also
The Heroes of Olympus
The Demigod Files

References

External links
 

The Heroes of Olympus
2012 short story collections
Fantasy short story collections
2012 children's books
Hyperion Books books